North Vancouver-Lonsdale is a provincial electoral district for the Legislative Assembly of British Columbia, Canada.

For other current and historical North Shore and City of Vancouver ridings, please see Vancouver (electoral districts)

Demographics

Geography

History 
The riding was created for the 1991 election from parts of North Vancouver-Capilano and North Vancouver-Seymour.

MLAs

Member of Legislative Assembly 
The riding's MLA is Bowinn Ma of the British Columbia New Democratic Party.

Election results

2020

2017

2013

2009

|-

|}

2005

2001

|-

|-

 
|NDP
|Roger Kishi
|align="right"|3,016
|align="right"|15.89%
|align="right"|
|align="right"|$8,218

|No Affiliation
|Jonathan Xerxes Cote
|align="right"|173
|align="right"|0.91%
|align="right"|
|align="right"|$784

|}

1996

|-

|-
 
|NDP
|David D. Schreck
|align="right"|7,151
|align="right"|35.56%
|align="right"|
|align="right"|$23,029

|Natural Law
|Sheila Elliott
|align="right"|93
|align="right"|0.46%
|align="right"|
|align="right"|$144

|}

1991

|-
 
|NDP
|David D. Schreck
|align="right"|7,535
|align="right"|38.63%
|align="right"|
|align="right"|$35,238
|-

|}

References

External links 
BC Stats Profile - 2001 (pdf)
Results of 2001 election (pdf)
2001 Expenditures
Results of 1996 election
1996 Expenditures
Results of 1991 election
1991 Expenditures
Website of the Legislative Assembly of British Columbia

British Columbia provincial electoral districts
North Vancouver (city)
North Vancouver (district municipality)
Provincial electoral districts in Greater Vancouver and the Fraser Valley